Triplophysa sellaefer is a species of ray-finned fish in the genus Triplophysa.

References
 

sellaefer
Taxa named by John Treadwell Nichols
Fish described in 1925